John Waddington (24 May 1938 – 6 July 2019) was an Australian rules footballer who played with North Melbourne in the Victorian Football League (VFL).

Waddington, a half forward, originally from Beaufort, tried out with Melbourne in 1957, then topped the Bendigo Football League goal-kicking in 1957, with 72 goals for South Bendigo. 

The following year he arrived at North Melbourne and played all possible 20 games in his debut season. This included their four-point semi final win over Fitzroy, in which he contributed three goals.

He remained a regular fixture in the team for the next eight years, mostly as a defender. It was as a centre half-back that he was selected for the Victorian interstate side in 1964.

At the end of the 1966 season he left North Melbourne to become senior captain-coach of Benalla in the Ovens & Murray Football League. He won the 1968 O&MFL Morris Medal.

He later played with Morningside in Queensland.

References

Links
 John Waddington Profile at Demonwiki

1938 births
Australian rules footballers from Victoria (Australia)
North Melbourne Football Club players
South Bendigo Football Club players
Benalla Football Club players
Morningside Australian Football Club players
2019 deaths